Melissa Farman (born 1990) is an American actress. She is known for playing a young Danielle Rousseau in Lost (portrayed by Mira Furlan as an adult) and for her role as Bristol Palin in HBO's Game Change.

Early life
After being born in New York City, she moved to Paris and grew up in an English- and French-speaking home. At the age of ten Farman was accepted into the Bilingual Acting Workshop for professional actors in Paris.

Career
Farman had a role in Cold Case and most notably in Lost as a young Danielle Rousseau. She has played in TV movies as well, including a role in Temple Grandin (an HBO biopic of Temple Grandin), and played Bristol Palin in the HBO Television movie Game Change. She also played Izzy in Call Me Crazy: A Five Film.

In 2014, she starred in the Western drama series Strange Empire on CBC Television.

Filmography

Film

Television

References

External links

 
 

American television actresses
American expatriate actresses in France
University of Southern California alumni
Living people
1990 births